Crazy World may refer to:
 Crazy World (Scorpions album), 1990
 Crazy World (Boys Like Girls album), 2012
 "Crazy World" (Young Jeezy song), 2008
 "Crazy World" (Big Trouble song), 1987
 "Crazy World" (Aslan song), 1993
 "Crazy World", a bonus track by ABBA from ABBA
"Crazy World", a song by Ladyhawke from Ladyhawke
"Crazy World," a song from the musical film Victor/Victoria and the later stage musical of the same name derived from it.